Doris Wells (born Doris María Buonafina; 28 October 1943 – 20 September 1988) was a Venezuelan actress, writer and producer.

Her best-known television appearances were in Campeones, La trepadora, La Hora, Historia de tres hermanas, Renzo el Gitano, Amor Salvaje, Regina Carbonell, El Mulato, La señora de Cárdenas and La fiera. After the last of these, Wells announced her definitive retirement from soap operas and she debuted as writer and producer with the television movie Porcelana (in 1981). In 1985 she played the protagonist in the film Oriana (written by Fina Torres), which won the Golden Camera at the Cannes Film Festival. She retired from television in 1986 shortly after hosting the game show Concurso millonario, and died in Caracas.

Personal life & death
Wells was born in  Caripito. She and her husband, William Risquez Iribarren, a wealthy lawyer, had three children (Marielba, Xavier and Verónica). Wells died on 20 September 1988, aged 44, from a rare illness.

Filmography

Television

References

1943 births
1988 deaths
Venezuelan film actresses
Venezuelan screenwriters
Venezuelan telenovela actresses
People from Monagas
20th-century Venezuelan actresses
20th-century screenwriters
Venezuelan women screenwriters